Prince is a census-designated place (CDP) in Fayette County, West Virginia, United States. As of the 2010 census, its population was 116. Located at an altitude of 1,263 feet (385 m), it is served by an Amtrak station.

The community was named after William Prince, an early settler.

References

External links
 West Virginia Cyclopedia - Prince, WV

Census-designated places in Fayette County, West Virginia
Census-designated places in West Virginia
New River Gorge National Park and Preserve